Judith Gail "Judy" Garber (born 1961) is an American diplomat who served as the United States ambassador to Cyprus from 2019 to 2022. She previously served as the United States ambassador to Latvia and as the acting assistant secretary for Oceans, Environment and Science at the State Department.

Career
Garber has been a career Foreign Service Officer since 1984. She was the ambassador to Latvia from 2009 to 2012, and prior to that served in a variety of foreign and domestic posts, including economic counselor in Madrid and director of North Central Europe in the Bureau of European and Eurasian Affairs. In August 2018, Garber was nominated by President Donald Trump to serve as the United States ambassador to Cyprus. Prior to becoming Ambassador to Cyprus, she served as acting Assistant Secretary for Oceans, Environment and Science at the Department of State.

Personal life 
Garber obtained her bachelor's degree in International Economics from the Georgetown University Edmund A. Walsh School of Foreign Service. She is married with two children. Garber speaks Spanish, Hebrew, Czech and Latvian.

References

External links

 Judith Gail Garber (1961–), Office of the Historian, U.S. Department of State

1961 births
Living people
Walsh School of Foreign Service alumni
United States Foreign Service personnel
Ambassadors of the United States to Latvia
Obama administration personnel
United States Assistant Secretaries of State
Ambassadors of the United States to Cyprus
21st-century American diplomats
American women ambassadors
21st-century American women
American women diplomats